This is a list of singles that topped the Irish Singles Chart in 1965.

Prior to 1992, the Irish singles chart was compiled from trade shipments from the labels to record stores, rather than on consumer sales.

The chart release date changed from Friday to Monday effective 4 January and then to Sunday on 5 December.

See also
1965 in music
Irish Singles Chart
List of artists who reached number one in Ireland

1965 in Irish music
1965 record charts
1965